See Archaic humans in Southeast Asia for the earlier presence of archaic humans.

Southeast Asia was first reached by anatomically modern humans in two distinct waves before 50,000 years ago, possibly firstly before 70,000 years ago. Anatomically modern humans are suggested to have reached Southeast Asia twice in the course of the Southern Dispersal migrations during and after the formation of a distinct East Asian clade, at around 50,000 years ago.

Archeological discoveries
In Asia, the most recent late archaic human fossils were found in China (125-100 ka), the Philippines (58-24 ka), Malaysia (c. 40 ka), and Sri Lanka (c.36 ka). The artifacts from these sites include partial skeleton, crania, deep skull, and other related skeletons indicate that modern human migrated to Asia earlier than the western theory might have discussed.

In 2007, an analysis of cut marks on two bovid bones found in Sangiran, showed them to have been made 1.5 to 1.6 million years ago by clamshell tools. This may be the oldest evidence for the presence of early humans in today Indonesia and are to date the oldest evidence of shell tool use in the world.

In 2009, archaeologists discovered the partial cranium and some teeth of a modern human at Tam Pa Ling in mainland Laos, which shed light on the understanding of anatomically modern human migration and evolution in the region during the Late Pleistocene Period. The site is located in Houaphanh Province, around 170 miles north of Vientiane, the capital city of modern Laos. Within this site, only human remains were found, and there is no evidence of human occupation or other artifacts. The radiocarbon dating of the charcoal and the sediment dating analyses identify the remains to date at least c. 56.5 ka, while the dental artifacts from the remains that analyzed by the isotope-ratio measurement indicate c. 63.6 ka. The analysis of the cranium and dentition of the remains suggest that these are the remains of early modern human populations in Southeast Asia. This date is older than the fossils that were found in Niah cave in Malaysia, which offers another explanation for human evolution in Southeast Asia.

In addition to the discovery in Laos, there are also a number of human remains and related artifacts found across mainland Southeast Asia in which it suggests the new ideas of the regional Late Pleistocene development as well. More teeth and molars that were found in Thailand and Vietnam sites (Tham Wihan Naki, Thailand; Tham Kuyean, Vietnam, etc.) indicate transitions between H. erectus and H. sapiens. In fact, these remains might indicate the possible interbreeding between H. erectus and H. sapiens, such as the tooth at Wihan Nakin at Chaiyaphum province in Thailand.

Migrations
The earliest modern human inhabitants of Southeast Asia were hunter-gatherers that arrived in the area at least c. 40,000 BP. Contemporary remnant groups of these earliest inhabitants (e.g. the Semang of Malaysia or the Aetas of the Philippines) are usually included under the cover term "Negrito". The earliest settlers had sufficient maritime technology to cross the Wallace Line, probably at a similar date to the first settlement of Sahul ( 45,000 BP/49,00043,000 BP).

The Neolithic was characterized by several migrations from southern China into Mainland and Island Southeast Asia by Austroasiatic and Austronesian-speakers.

During the Neolithic, Austroasiatic peoples populated Indochina via land routes. The earliest agricultural societies that cultivated millet and wet-rice emerged around 1700 BCE in the lowlands and river floodplains of Indochina. Based on archaeological and genetic evidence, it is assumed that Austroasiatic speakers also expanded into Insular Southeast Asia in the Neolithic, but were later supplanted or assimilated by Austronesian speakers. 

The most widespread migration event was the Austronesian expansion, which began at around 5,500 BP (3500 BC) from coastal southern China via Taiwan. Due to their use of ocean-going outrigger boats and voyaging catamarans, Austronesians rapidly colonized Island Southeast Asia, before spreading further into Micronesia, Melanesia, Polynesia, Madagascar and the Comoros. They dominated the lowlands and coasts of Island Southeast Asia, giving rise to modern Islander Southeast Asians, Micronesians, Polynesians, and Malagasy. The first Austronesians reached the Philippines at around 2200 BC, settling the Batanes Islands and northern Luzon from Taiwan. From there, they rapidly spread downwards to the rest of the islands of the Philippines and Southeast Asia.

The widespread presence of Kra-Dai, Tibeto-Burman, and Hmong-Mien speakers in Mainland Southeast Asia is the result of later migrations. Originating from southern China, where many languages of these families are still spoken, they expanded southwards into Southeast Asia in historical times around the second half of the first millennium CE.

Trade
Territorial principalities in both Insular and Mainland Southeast Asia, characterised as Agrarian kingdoms had by around 500 BCE developed an economy based on surplus crop cultivation and moderate coastal trade of domestic natural products. Several states of the Malayan-Indonesian "thalassian" zone shared these characteristics with Indochinese polities like the Pyu city-states in the Irrawaddy river valley, Van Lang in the Red River delta and Funan around the lower Mekong. Văn Lang, founded in the 7th century BCE endured until 258 BCE under the rule of the Hồng Bàng dynasty, as part of the Đông Sơn culture eventually sustained a dense and organised population, that produced an elaborate Bronze Age industry.

Intensive wet-rice cultivation in an ideal climate enabled the farming communities to produce a regular crop surplus, that was used by the ruling elite to raise, command and pay work forces for public construction and maintenance projects such as canals and fortifications. Though millet and rice cultivation was introduced around 2000 BCE, hunting and gathering remained an important aspect of food provision, in particular in forested and mountainous inland areas.

Historians have emphasized the maritime connectivity of the Southeast Asian region whereby it can be analyzed as a single cultural and economic unit, as has been done with the Mediterranean basin. This region stretches from the Yangtze delta in China down to the Malay Peninsula, including the South China Sea, Gulf of Thailand and Java Sea. The region was dominated by the thalassocratic cultures of the Austronesian peoples.

Genetics

One study (Chaubey 2015) found evidence for ancient gene flow from East Asian-related groups into the Andamanese people, suggesting that Andamanese (Onge) had about 30%  East Asian-related ancestry next to their original Negrito ancestry, though the authors also suggest that this latter finding may in fact reflect the genetic affinity of the Andamanese to Melanesian, Southeast Asian, and Asian Negrito populations rather than true East Asian admixture (stating that "The Han ancestry measured in Andaman Negrito is probably partially capturing both Melanesian and Malaysian Negrito ancestry"), as a previous study by the authors (Chaubey et al.) indicated "a deep common ancestry" between Andamanese, Melanesians and other Negrito groups (as well as South Asians), and an affinity between Southeast Asian Negritos and Melanesians with East Asians.

A 2020 genetic study on Southeast Asian populations focusing on ethnic groups in Vietnam by Liu et al. 2020 found that most sampled groups are closely related to East Asians and carry mostly "East Asian-related" ancestry. Modern Austronesian and Austroasiatic speaking populations of Southeast Asia were found to have mostly East Asian-related ancestry (89% to 96%, with 94% on average). Taiwanese indigenous peoples had on average 99% East Asian-related ancestry. Kra–Dai-speaking populations had, similar to the Taiwanese indigenous peoples, nearly exclusively East Asian-related ancestry.

A recent study from 2021 found that an ancient Holocene hunter-gatherer from South Sulawesi had ancestry from both a distinct lineage related to modern Papuans and Aboriginal Australians and from the East-Eurasian lineage (represented by modern East Asians). The hunter-gatherer individual had approximately ~50% "Basal-East Asian" ancestry, and was positioned in between modern East Asians and Papuans of Oceania. The authors concluded that East Asian-related ancestry expanded much earlier into Maritime Southeast Asia than previously suggested, long before the expansion of Austroasiatic and Austronesian groups.

Another study about the ancestral composition of modern ethnic groups in the Philippines from 2021 suggests that distinctive Basal-East Asian (East-Eurasian) ancestry originated in Mainland Southeast Asia at ~50,000BC, and expanded through multiple migration waves southwards and northwards respectively.

See also
 Archaic humans in Southeast Asia
 Prehistoric Southeast Asia
 Models of migration to the Philippines
 Peopling of Thailand
 Austronesian expansion
 Genetic history of East Asians
 Genetic history of South Asians
 Genetic studies on Filipinos
 List of first human settlements

Notes

References

Further reading